Didymocyrtis may refer to:

 Didymocyrtis (fungus), a Dothideomycetes incertae sedis genus
 Didymocyrtis (protist), a Spumellarian protist genus in the family Coccodiscidae and subfamily Artiscinae